Gilbert Glaus (born 3 December 1955) is a retired Swiss professional road bicycle racer. In 1978, Glaus became amateur world champion, and he became a professional cyclist in 1982. In 1983, Glaus won a stage in the 1983 Tour de France, but in the 1984 Tour de France he was the Lanterne rouge (the last finishing cyclist). He was the Swiss National Road Race champion in 1982. He also competed in the individual road race and team time trial events at the 1980 Summer Olympics.

Major results

1977
Giro del Mendrisiotto
GP Tell
1978
 World Amateur Road Race Championship
1979
Stausee-Rundfahrt Klingnau
1980
Giro del Mendrisiotto
1981
Giro del Mendrisiotto
Stausee-Rundfahrt Klingnau
1982
 National Road Race Championship
Montauroux
1983
GP de Cannes
Hegiberg-Rundfahrt
Tour de France:
Winner stage 22
1985
Aarwangen
Meyrin
1986
GP de Cannes
Bordeaux–Paris
1987
Antibes
Meyrin
Trofeo Laigueglia
1989
Stausee-Rundfahrt Klingnau
1992
Stausee-Rundfahrt Klingnau

References

External links 

Official Tour de France results for Gilbert Glaus

1955 births
Living people
People from Thun
Swiss male cyclists
Swiss Tour de France stage winners
Tour de France Champs Elysées stage winners
Olympic cyclists of Switzerland
Cyclists at the 1980 Summer Olympics
Sportspeople from the canton of Bern